Comalapa is a compound Nahuatl word derived from comalli ("griddle")+"apa" ("place of"), it may refer to any of the following geographical locations:

El Salvador
Comalapa, Chalatenango, El Salvador
Comalapa, La Paz, location of the Comalapa International Airport, in La Paz Department
Comalapa River, river in the La Paz Department of El Salvador
Guatemala
San Juan Comalapa, Chimaltenango
Mexico
 Frontera Comalapa
 Comalapa, River in Mexico
Nicaragua
Comalapa, Chontales, Departamento de Chontales